This is the discography of American R&B singer Nivea, containing information about her albums, singles and guest appearances.

Albums

Studio albums

EPs

Singles

Promotional singles

Guest appearances
These songs have not appeared on a studio album released by Nivea:

Notes

References

Discographies of American artists
Rhythm and blues discographies